Deborah Sinnreich-Levi is an American scholar of medieval literature who specializes in the work of the French 14th-c poet Eustache Deschamps and was called a "pioneer in the revival of interest in Deschamps", a poet who had long been neglected. Sinnreich-Levi received her B.A. from Queens College, City University of New York and her graduate degrees (Ph.D., M.A., M.Ph.) from Graduate Center, CUNY; her doctorate was granted in 1987. She attended the Summer Latin Workshop at University of California, Berkeley, in 1980. She teaches at Stevens Institute of Technology.

She edited and translated Deschamps' , his treatise on verse.

Selected bibliography

References

Year of birth missing (living people)
Living people
Graduate Center, CUNY alumni
Queens College, City University of New York alumni
Stevens Institute of Technology faculty